Escuadrón de Carabineros de Carlos IV was a Spanish military unit of Buenos Aires created on the occasion of the English Invasions to the Río de la Plata.

History 

This cavalry militia unit was created on November 22, 1806, bearing the name of Carlos IV, in honor of the King of Spain. It was composed of 190 men divided into three cavalry companies. Its commander was Benito Rivadavia, a lawyer and merchant born in Galicia, who participated in the command of this unit in the reconquest of Buenos Aires during the first English Invasion.

During the second invasion, its commander was Lucas Fernández, an Andalusian merchant, who financed the expenses of the Escuadrón de Carabineros de Carlos IV. It was dissolved by order of the Governing Board after the May Revolution.

References 

Regiments of Argentina
Military history of Argentina
Río de la Plata
Military units and formations of the Napoleonic Wars